Pennyroyal may refer to:

Herbs
Mentha pulegium (pennyroyal or European pennyroyal), a European herb
Hedeoma pulegioides (American pennyroyal or false pennyroyal), an American herb
Monardella odoratissima (mountain pennyroyal), mint family plant found in the southwestern United States

Places
Pennyroyal, Victoria, a rural locality in Australia
Pennyroyal Plateau, also known locally as "Pennyrile", a region of Kentucky in the United States
Pennyrile Parkway, a highway in Kentucky

Other
"Pennyroyal Tea", a 1993 song by Nirvana
Penny Royal, an AI character from Neal Asher's Polity series